Jean-Paul Charié (25 April 1952, Égry - 3 November 2009) was a member of the National Assembly of France.  He represented the 5th constituency in the Loiret department from 1988 to 2009,  and was a member of the Union for a Popular Movement.

When he died, he was succeeded by Marianne Dubois.

References

1952 births
2009 deaths
People from Loiret
Rally for the Republic politicians
Union for a Popular Movement politicians
Deputies of the 12th National Assembly of the French Fifth Republic
Deputies of the 13th National Assembly of the French Fifth Republic